Dirk Smorenberg (September 4, 1883 – September 14, 1960) was a Dutch painter.

Smorenberg was born in Alkmaar, North Holland. He started painting in 1906 on a professional base. He is considered as one of the few Dutch Art Deco painters.

He travelled to St. Ives as an artist/painter in the beginning of the World War I. He also worked in Switzerland not far from Montreux and in 1910/1911 in the USA. There he exhibited with Piet Mondriaan in New York City. He settled down in the beginning of the twenties in the lake district of Loosdrecht where he lived until he died in September 1960.
He painted in a decorative way. The water lilies on the lake were one of his beloved subjects.

External links 
 Site Dirk Smorenberg

1883 births
1960 deaths
People from Alkmaar
Art Deco artists
20th-century Dutch painters
Dutch male painters
20th-century Dutch male artists